Better Halves (金牌冰人) is a TVB costume television series, premiered in 2003. Theme song "Beautiful Fate" (美麗緣份) composition and arrangement by Joseph Koo, lyricist by Wong Jim, sung by Steven Ma.

Plot summary
Chuen Ka Fok  (Steven Ma), Lien Bak Hap (Maggie Cheung Ho-yee) and Ling Wu Hei (Joyce Koi) are matchmakers in ancient China. Ka Fok  and Bak Hap acting in a private capacity and Wu Hei in an official government capacity. In the course of their business Ka Fok and Bak Hap come into conflict, before deciding that they can maximize profits by working together. Despite finding matches for others Ka Fok and Bak Hap find it impossible to find a spouse for themselves, until they discover that their parents had already long ago arranged a betrothal between the two.

Ling Wu Hei is a woman who has to pretend to be a male in order to fulfill her family's hereditary office of court match maker, this leads to difficulties when she falls in love with Ko Fei (Moses Chan) in a society intolerant of homosexuals.

Cast

Main cast
Steven Ma as Chuen Ka Fok 
Maggie Cheung Ho-yee as Lien Bak Hap
Moses Chan as Ko Fei 
Joyce Koi as Ling Wu Hei

Supporting cast
Cerina da Graca as Sang Seung Seung
Auguste Kwan as Ping On
Henry Yu as Lien Yung
Cheung Ying Choi as Ling Wu Cik
Lily Li as Wai Leung
Angelina Lo as Wan Leung
Chuen Cho Fu as Lam Choi Ching
Choi Hong Nin as Lau Sai Kwong
June Chan as Yung Yuk Lan
Simon Lo as Tong Man Sang
Angela Tong as Po Yue
Kevin Cheng as Choi Chi Chau
Sharon Chan as Fan Chi Kiu
Deno Cheung as Wing 
Evergreen Mak as Choi Hiu
Winnie Yeung as Yuet Leung
Yeung Ying Wai as Yuen Tin Ha
Mark Kwok as Chun
Chung Chai Bo as Ting Chung Yee
Lo Lok Lan as Chun Tai Cho
Lo Hoi-pang as Ting

Viewership ratings

References

External links
Official website 

2003 Hong Kong television series debuts
2003 Hong Kong television series endings
TVB dramas